Marjorie Virginia Strider (January 26, 1931 – August 27, 2014) was an American painter, sculptor and performance artist best known for her three-dimensional paintings and site-specific soft sculpture installations.

Biography
Born in 1931 in Guthrie, Oklahoma, Strider studied art at the Kansas City Art Institute before moving to New York City in the early 1960s.  Strider's three-dimensional paintings of beach girls with "built out" curves were prominently featured in the Pace Gallery's 1964 "International Girlie Show" alongside other "pin-up"-inspired pop art by Rosalyn Drexler, Roy Lichtenstein, Andy Warhol, and Tom Wesselmann.  Her comically pornographic Woman with Radish was made into the banner image for the show, one of the first successful exhibitions of the then-new gallery.  Her bold figural work from this era aimed to subvert sexist images of women in popular culture by turning objectified female bodies into menacing forms that literally got "in your face."  Strider had two subsequent solo exhibitions at the Pace Gallery in 1965 and 1966 where she continued to show her voluminous paintings of bikini-clad girls as well as 3-D renderings of vegetables, fruits, flowers, clouds and other natural phenomena.

Strider became a core member of the 1960s avant-garde.  She performed in happenings organized by Allan Kaprow, Claes Oldenburg and others.  In 1969 she organized with Hannah Weiner and John Perreault the first Street Work, an informal public art event.  Twenty artists participated including Vito Acconci, Gregory Battcock and Arakawa.  Strider's contribution was thirty empty picture frames which she hung in random locations in Midtown Manhattan in the hopes of getting pedestrians to look at their environment differently. Strider married Michael Kirby, a contemporary artist and writer who published the first book on happenings in 1965.

Around this time Strider made chocolate casts of Patty Oldenburg's breasts for Claes's birthday (a plaster version was later acquired by Sol LeWitt). Perhaps it was her intimate friendship with the Oldenburgs that led Strider to redirect her artistic focus from hard sculptural paintings to soft sculpture in the 1970s.  She made site-specific installations of unbridled polyurethane foam that tumbled out of windows (Building Work 1976, PS1) or oozed down a spiral staircase (Blue Sky 1976, Clocktower Gallery). At times her renegade pours incorporated domestic objects (brooms, groceries, teapots), while others remained totally amorphous. These works are similar in style and intent to Lynda Benglis' floor paintings and soft sculptures of the same era.

From 1982 to 1985, a retrospective of her work toured museums and universities across the United States. Venues included: SculptureCenter, New York; Gibbes Museum of Art, Charleston, South Carolina; Joslyn Art Museum, Omaha, Nebraska; Museum of Art, University of Arizona, Tucson; and the McNay Art Museum, San Antonio, Texas.  In the 1990s, she began to make paintings with tactile surfaces that were more Abstract Expressionist than Pop.  In 2009 she revisited her original girlie theme, painting new examples which she exhibited at the Bridge Gallery, New York.

Marjorie Strider died at her home in Saugerties, New York, on August 27, 2014.

Public collections
Albright–Knox Art Gallery, Buffalo New York
Aldrich Contemporary Art Museum, Ridgefield, Connecticut
Boca Raton Museum of Art, Boca Raton, Florida
CUNY Graduate Center, New York
University of Colorado Boulder, Colorado
Danforth Museum of Art, Framingham, Massachusetts
Des Moines Art Center, Des Moines, Iowa
First National Bank, Seattle, Washington
Solomon R. Guggenheim Museum, New York
Hirshhorn Museum and Sculpture Garden, Washington, D.C.
Indianapolis Museum of Art, Indianapolis, Indiana
McNay Art Museum, San Antonio, Texas
New York University, New York
Newark Museum, Newark, New Jersey
New Mexico Museum of Art, Santa Fe, New Mexico
Storm King Art Center, Mountainville, New York
Temple University, Philadelphia, Pennsylvania
Vero Beach Museum of Art, Vero Beach, Florida
Wadsworth Atheneum, Hartford, Connecticut

Selected exhibitions
2011 Hollis Taggart Galleries, New York, "Marjorie Strider" [solo exhibition] (catalogue)
2010 University of the Arts, Philadelphia, "Seductive Subversion: Women Pop Artists, 1958–1968" [traveling exhibition] (catalogue)
1999 Neuberger Museum of Art, SUNY Purchase (catalogue)
1995 Andre Zarre Gallery, New York, "Recent Paintings”
1988–90 Finn Square, New York, "Sunflower Plaza," outdoor installation
1984 Bernice Steinbaum Gallery, New York, "Wall Sculpture and Drawings”
1982 Myers Fine Art Gallery, SUNY Plattsburgh, "Marjorie Strider: 10 Years, 1970–1980" [traveling exhibition through 1985] (catalogue)
1976 The Clocktower, New York
1976 PS1, New York
1974 Weatherspoon Art Gallery, University of North Carolina, Greensboro, "Strider: Sculpture and Drawings 1972–1974" (brochure)
1966  Pace Gallery, New York
1965 Pace Gallery, New York
1964 Pace Gallery, New York, "First International Girlie Exhibit"

Selected bibliography
Alloway, Lawrence. Great Drawings of All Time: The Twentieth Century, Volume 2, New York: Shorewood/Talisman, 1981.
Battock, Gregory., ed. Super Realism: A Critical Anthology, New York: Dutton, 1975
Dewey, Diane. "Marjorie Strider, Pioneering ’60s Artist Remains a Creative Force: Influential Postmodernist Continues to Speak through her Strong Contemporary Style," Artes Magazine, November 24, 2009
Hess, Thomas B. and Elizabeth C. Baker, eds. Art and Sexual Politics. New York: MacMillan
Hess and Linda Nochlin, eds. Woman as Sex Object. New York: Newsweek, Inc., 1972
Hunter, Sam. American Art of the 20th Century. New York: Harry N. Abrams, 1972
Johnston, Jill. Marmalade Me. New York: Dutton, 1971
Jones, V. W. Contemporary American Women Sculptors. Phoenix: Onyx Press, 1983
Kirby, Michael. The Art of Time. New York: Dutton, 1969
Lippard, Lucy. Pop Art. New York: Frederick A. Praeger, 1966
Lippard. From the Center, feminist essays on women’s art. New York: E.P. Dutton & Co., Inc., 1976
Lippard. Six Years: the dematerialization of the art object. New York: Praeger, 1973
Lippard. The Pink Glass Swan, 1995.
Pincus-Witten, Robert. Postminimalism. New York: Out of London Press, 1977
Rubinstein, Charlotte Streifer. American Women Sculptors, A History of Women Working in Three Dimensions. Boston: G.K. Hall & Co., 1991
Sachs, Sid and Kalliopi Minioudaki, eds. Seductive Subversion: Women Pop Artists, 1958–1968. Philadelphia, PA: University of the Arts, Philadelphia, 2010.
Semmel, Joan. A New Eros. New York: Hacker Art Books, 1977
Sewall-Ruskin, Yvonne. High On Rebellion. New York: Thunders Mouth Press, 1998
Yau, John. Marjorie Strider. New York: Hollis Taggart Galleries, 2011

References

External links
NY Times obituary
Marjorie Strider at Mark Borghi Fine Art Inc
Marjorie Strider on AskART
MarjorieStrider.com – Exclusive agent for the works of Marjorie Strider.

1934 births
2014 deaths
Sculptors from Oklahoma
American pop artists
American women painters
American women sculptors
American women performance artists
American performance artists
People from Guthrie, Oklahoma
People from Saugerties, New York
Pop art
20th-century American women artists
21st-century American women